The 2017 International Challenger Zhangjiagang was a professional tennis tournament played on hard courts. It was the first edition of the tournament which was part of the 2017 ATP Challenger Tour. It took place in Zhangjiagang, China between 5 and 10 September 2017.

Singles main-draw entrants

Seeds

 1 Rankings are as of 28 August 2017.

Other entrants
The following players received wildcards into the singles main draw:
  Gao Xin
  Sun Fajing
  Wang Chuhan
  Zhang Zhizhen

The following player received entry into the singles main draw as an alternate:
  Henri Laaksonen

The following players received entry from the qualifying draw:
  Yuya Kibi
  Marinko Matosevic
  Bradley Mousley
  Miliaan Niesten

Champions

Singles

 Jason Jung def.  Zhang Ze 6–4, 2–6, 6–4.

Doubles

 Gao Xin /  Zhang Zhizhen def.  Chen Ti /  Yi Chu-huan 6–2, 6–3.

References

2017 ATP Challenger Tour
2017
Zhang